UFC: The Ultimate Ultimate 2 (also known as Ultimate Ultimate 1996 or UFC 11.5) was a mixed martial arts event held by the Ultimate Fighting Championship on December 7, 1996. The event took place at the Fair Park Arena in Birmingham, Alabama, and was broadcast live on pay-per-view in the United States, and released on home video.

History
The card featured an eight man tournament with two alternate bouts, and was the UFC's second "Ultimate Ultimate" tournament, held to find the best of the winners and runners up from past UFC events. This event was the first to introduce the "no grabbing of the fence" rule.

Ken Shamrock appeared as a guest on Late Night with Conan O'Brien on the mainstream network NBC to promote the event, a groundbreaking moment for the young sport of mixed martial arts.

UFC 10 and UFC 11 champion Mark Coleman was originally scheduled to compete in the tournament but was forced to withdraw from the event due to a virus.

The Ultimate Ultimate 1996 also marked the final appearance of UFC Hall of Famer Ken Shamrock before leaving the UFC to go to the World Wrestling Federation. Shamrock would not return to the UFC until 2002 at UFC 40.

The event would also be the last time Don Frye fought in the UFC, as he would also transition into pro wrestling, signing with New Japan Pro-Wrestling. Mark Hall, who Frye defeated in the semifinals, would later claim that Don Frye and manager Robert DePersia came into his dressing room during the tournament and convinced him to throw the two fighters' upcoming semi-final match. Hall says that since Tank Abbott had already advanced to the final after two relatively easy wins, Frye – who’d logged eleven minutes of cage time already that night – wanted to save his energy for the championship match. Because he'd already suffered two defeats to Frye earlier in his career (and therefore probably wasn't going to win anyway) and DePersia implied that saying no would have a disastrous impact on his future, Hall says he reluctantly agreed to go along with the plot. Frye won by Achilles lock submission in twenty seconds. Referee John McCarthy later wrote in his autobiography Let's Get It On!:

Results

Ultimate Ultimate 96 bracket

1Ken Shamrock withdrew due to injury, and was replaced by alternate Steve Nelmark.

2Kimo Leopoldo withdrew due to fatigue, and was replaced by alternate Mark Hall.

See also 
 Ultimate Fighting Championship
 List of UFC champions
 List of UFC events
 1996 in UFC

References

External links
UU 96 results at Sherdog.com
UU 96 fights reviews
Official UFC website

Ultimate Fighting Championship events
1996 in mixed martial arts
Mixed martial arts in Alabama
Sports in Birmingham, Alabama
1996 in sports in Alabama